The following is a partial list of notable people who have been full-time or significant part-time residents of Laguna Beach, California, United States.

Actors

George Beranger
William Boyd
Barbara Britton
Bette Davis
Robert Englund
Douglas Fairbanks, Jr.
Mike Farrell and Judy Farrell
Judy Garland
Sterling Holloway
Rock Hudson
Tab Hunter
Elmo Lincoln
Fredric March
Victor Mature
Kent McCord
Bette Midler
Mary Miles Minter
Polly Moran
Ozzie Nelson and Harriet Nelson
Franklin Pangborn
Gigi Parrish
Mary Pickford
Adele Ritchie
Mickey Rooney
Ruth Roman
Rita Rudner
Charlotte Shelby
Margaret Shelby
Grant Sullivan 
Slim Summerville
Claire Trevor
Bobs Watson
Rudolph Valentino

Artists

Mark Bloch, conceptual artist, writer 
Mark Chamberlain, photographer 
Frank Cuprien, painter and "Dean of Laguna Artists" 
Paul Blaine Henrie, painter 
Abby Williams Hill, painter 
Anna Althea Hills, painter and founder of Laguna Art Museum 
Thomas Lorraine Hunt, painter 
George Hurrell, photographer 
Frank Interlandi, editorial cartoonist 
Bil Keane, cartoonist 
Marie Boening Kendall, painter 
Joseph Kleitsch, painter 
Roger Kuntz, painter 
William Mortensen, photographer 
Edgar Alwin Payne, muralist and founder of Laguna Beach Art Association 
William Grant Sherry, painter 
George Gardner Symons, painter 
William Wendt, "Dean of Southern California artists" 
Robert William Wood, painter 
Robert Wyland, muralist 
Karl Yens, painter

Athletes

Hobie Alter, surfboard and sailboat designer 
Damon Berryhill, baseball player 
Dain Blanton, volleyball player 
Colt Brennan, football player 
Gavvy Cravath, baseball player 
Lindsay Davenport, tennis player 
Paul Deem, Olympic cyclist 
Annika Dries, water polo player 
Dusty Dvorak, volleyball player 
Seth Etherton, baseball pitcher 
Janet Evans, swimmer 
Scott Fortune, volleyball player 
Warren Gill, baseball player 
Tom Harmon, football player and sportscaster 
Jon Leach, tennis player 
Rick Leach, tennis player 
Tom Morey, inventor of the "Boogie Board" 
John H. Outland, namesake of college football Outland Trophy 
Mike Parsons, surfer 
John Pitts, football player 
Rachel Wacholder, beach volleyball player and model 
Dani Weatherholt, soccer player
Lefty Williams, baseball player

Musicians and singers

Frieda Belinfante, conductor and founder of the Orange County Philharmonic Orchestra
Taylor Hawkins, rock drummer, Foo Fighters 
Marion Hutton, big band singer 
Paula Kelly, big band singer 
Ricky Nelson, pop singer 
Jack Norworth, songwriter (wrote "Take Me Out to the Ballgame") 
Lee Rocker, bassist, The Stray Cats 
Vic Schoen, big band leader 
Richie Sambora, rock guitarist, Bon Jovi 
Ty Segall, singer-songwriter

Writers

Gregory Benford, author and astrophysicist 
Forrest E. "Skip" Fickling, author 
M. F. K. Fisher, culinary writer 
Arnold Hano, sportswriter  
Lisi Harrison, author
Hedda Hopper, gossip columnist 
Lawrence Clark Powell, author and librarian 
John Steinbeck, author 
Theodore Taylor, author 
John Weld, journalist 
Charles Wright, poet

Other

George Adamski, ufologist 
Buzz Aldrin, astronaut 
Steve Arterburn, radio talk show host 
Heidi Baker, missionary 
Steve Bannon, political advisor 
Florence "Pancho" Barnes, pioneer aviator 
Warren Buffett, business magnate 
Ron Burkle, business magnate 
David P. Bushnell, businessman
David O. Carter, federal judge 
Jonathan R. Cohen, Ambassador to Egypt 
Lauren Conrad, reality television personality 
William S. Darling, art director 
Bhagavan Das (formerly Michael Riggs), yogi 
Charles Douglass, inventor of the laugh track
Frank Fertitta III, casino owner 
Joe Francis, founder of Girls Gone Wild 
Christine Fugate, film director 
Pelham D. Glassford, United States Army Brigadier General
David B. Goldstein, human geneticist 
Bill H. Gross, investor and fund manager 
Sue Gross, investor 
Richard Halliburton, adventurer 
Douglas Hodge (born 1957), CEO of PIMCO
John Mills Houston, United States Congressman 
Christine Jorgensen, transsexual pioneer 
Eiler Larsen, town greeter 
Timothy Leary, psychologist and LSD advocate 
Greg MacGillivray, filmmaker 
Alan MacPherson, patent lawyer 
 Peter Navarro, economist and filmmaker 
Ward Ritchie, publisher and bibliophile 
Malcolm St. Clair, film director 
Robert A. Schuller, televangelist 
Walter Terence Stace, philosopher 
Samuel Totten, history professor 
Peter Ueberroth, sports commissioner 
Lila Zali, ballerina

Footnotes

 
Laguna Beach
Laguna Beach, California